Ainapuram is a village situated in Dr. B.R. Ambedkar Konaseema district in Mummidivaram Mandal, in Andhra Pradesh State.

References

Villages in Mummidivaram mandal